Francis Burton Harrison Avenue, commonly known as F. B. Harrison Avenue or Harrison Avenue, is a major north-south collector road in Pasay, western Metro Manila, Philippines. It is a four-lane undivided arterial running parallel to Roxas Boulevard to the west and Taft Avenue to the east, from Pasay's border with Malate district in the north to Baclaran in Parañaque in the south. The avenue is named for U.S. Governor-General of the Philippines, Francis Burton Harrison.

Street description

It is a public transportation or medium-occupancy-vehicle corridor which is frequented by intra-metropolitan jeepneys and mega-taxis. This condition gives Harrison Avenue its relatively slow-moving, congested and highly pedestrian character.

History
Harrison Avenue forms part of an old Spanish coastal highway that linked the Province of Manila to La Laguna and other southern provinces. It was called Calle Real or Camino Real (Spanish for "royal street") which spanned from Ermita to Muntinlupa. At present, only the Las Piñas and Muntinlupa section is called Calle Real or Real Street as an alternative name for the road. The Pasay portion, also historically known as Calle San Lucas, is renamed Harrison Avenue while those of the City of Manila and Parañaque have been renamed to Del Pilar Street and Quirino Avenue, respectively. It was also one of the right-of-way alignments of tranvía that existed until 1945.

References

Streets in Metro Manila